John Cameron Sheedy (28 September 1926 – 23 February 2023) was an Australian rules footballer and coach. Sheedy is considered one of the greatest ever footballers from Western Australia, being the first player from that state to play 300 games in elite Australian rules football, and was a member of both the Australian Football Hall of Fame and the West Australian Football Halls of Fame.

Overall, he played 323 senior career matches from 1944 to 1962, kicking 480 senior career goals, and also coached 272 senior career games, with a winning percentage of 65%.

Playing career

Early career and naval service
The son of A. F. "Barney" Sheedy, a former East Fremantle player and WAFL interstate representative, Sheedy attended Richmond State School in East Fremantle and Fremantle Boys' School in Fremantle, captaining both schools' football teams. He also led the school's batting averages at cricket, and later played First Grade cricket for the Fremantle Cricket Club in the Western Australian Grade Cricket competition. After leaving school, he played for Fremantle in the Fremantle Ex-Scholars competition, before making his debut for East Fremantle in the age-restricted WANFL competition in 1942. He enlisted in the Royal Australian Navy in March 1944, at only 17 years of age, and was immediately posted to Melbourne. Sheedy's unit then went to Sydney in, where he played with Sydney Naval, including in their 1944 premiership win in the New South Wales Australian National Football League (NSWANFL). He had kicked the winning goal in the preliminary final against Newtown the previous week with less than three minutes remaining in the match. He kicked 12 goals in three rounds in 1946 before he returned to Western Australia.

Return to Western Australia
Sheedy immediately made his senior debut for East Fremantle.

Transfer to East Perth and coaching career

Sheedy served as captain-coach of East Perth from 1956 to 1961, and as non-playing coach from 1962 to 1964, with one final season in 1969.

Personal life and death
Sheedy worked as a clerk at the Fremantle Harbour Trust. 

Sheedy died on 24 February 2023, at the age of 96.

Legacy and honours
Sheedy had a reputation as one of the toughest and most violent players in the WANFL, and was suspended numerous times.

In 2001 Sheedy was inducted into the Australian Football Hall of Fame. In 2004 he was inducted to the West Australian Football Hall of Fame and in 2005 he was elevated to Legend Status.

References

External links
 
 AFL Hall of Fame
 
 John Cameron (Jack) Sheedy player profile page at WAFLFootyFacts

1926 births
2023 deaths
Australian Football Hall of Fame inductees
East Fremantle Football Club coaches
East Fremantle Football Club players
East Perth Football Club coaches
East Perth Football Club players
Australian rules footballers from Fremantle
Sydney Swans players
Royal Australian Navy personnel of World War II
West Australian Football Hall of Fame inductees
Military personnel from Western Australia